The banded japalure (Diploderma fasciatum) is a species of lizard. Its habitat is montane forests. The IUCN Red List of Threatened Species has assessed the species to be of least concern.

References

Diploderma
Reptiles of Vietnam
Reptiles of China
Taxa named by Robert Mertens
Reptiles described in 1926
Taxobox binomials not recognized by IUCN